

Wilhelm J. Sluka or the Conditorei Sluka is a famous Konditorei and café in Vienna, and a traditional k.u.k. Hoflieferant.
It is located at Rathausplatz 8 (previously Reichsratsstrasse 13) in the first district of Vienna, the Innere Stadt.

History 
The Konditorei was founded in 1891 by Wilhelm Josef Sluka and his wife Josefine. On the basis of his high-quality products Sluka received in 1896 the title of "confectioner to the k.u.k. court" ("k.u.k. Hofzuckerbäcker"). The café was patronised by customers of the highest social strata, including the Empress Elisabeth. Its central location and discrete atmosphere attracted ministers and representatives from the nearby Parliament Building on the Ringstrasse, gentlemen from the Rathaus, stars of the Burgtheater and members of the nobility and bourgeoisie.

Sluka still enjoys great popularity, particularly among tourists.

In 2000 the establishment was awarded the Goldene Kaffeebohne ("Golden Coffee-Bean")  by  Jacobs.

See also
 Demel
 List of restaurants in Vienna
 Sluka

References

Further reading 
 Haslinger, Ingrid, 1996: Kunde – Kaiser. Die Geschichte der ehemaligen k. u. k. Hoflieferanten. Vienna: Schroll 
 Haslinger, I., Patka, E., Jesch, M.-L., 1996: Der süße Luxus. Die Hofzuckerbäckerei und die ehemaligen k. u. k. Hofzuckerbäcker Demel, Gerbeaud, Gerstner, Heiner, Rumpelmayer, Sluka. (exhibition by the Kulturkreis Looshaus). Vienna: Agens Werk Geyer + Reisser

External links 

 Website of the Conditorei Sluka 

Coffeehouses and cafés in Vienna
Chocolateries
Purveyors to the Imperial and Royal Court
Buildings and structures in Innere Stadt
1861 establishments
Businesspeople from Vienna
Austrian people of Czech descent